Guzmania kraenzliniana is a plant species in the genus Guzmania. It is a member of the family Bromeliaceae. It is an epiphyte.

References

kraenzliniana
Epiphytes